Rosana Ubanell (born 1958 in Pamplona, Spain), is a news journalist and the first Spanish language novelist to ever be published by Penguin Books.

Journalism
Ubanell is a graduate of the University of Navarra, where she received an undergraduate degree in journalism, and George Mason University, where she received an MBA in International Transactions. After graduating, she worked as a correspondent for various Spanish publications, including the magazine Tiempo de Hoy, for which she was the Brussels correspondent from 1986 to 1990. While there she eventually became the Director of the Department of Communications at the Confederación Española de Organizaciones Empresariales in Brussels. In 1990, she moved to Washington, D.C. where she worked as correspondent for the magazine Tribuna de la Actualidad. In 2002, she then moved to Miami to become the Assignment Editor of American Airlines' Spanish-language magazine Nexos.

Books
In 2011, she released her first novel Volver a Morir, a Spanish-language detective novel based in the city of Miami. Critics have stated that her book represents a crossing of cultural boundaries by placing a Hispanic protagonist (Nelson Montero) in the central role of an American-based mystery. It was also the first Spanish-language novel ever published by the publishing giant Penguin Books. Penguin is also slated to publish the second installment of Ubanell's Nelson Montero detective series.

In 2012, she released her second novel Perdido en tu piel, described by Fox News Latino as telling, "the story of two lovers who meet again after 30 years without any news of each other and mixes that 'unique first love, without barriers' with a story of suspense and secrets that takes place, among other locations, in New York, Marbella and Mexico." Ubanell also stated in 2013 that she had two more Nelson Montero books in the works in order to continue the series that debuted with her first novel. When asked why she turned to a romantic novel for the storyline of her second book she stated that, "So much is said about love but we still don’t know what it is. I wanted to explore it, to delve into that universal emotion the Greeks used to call 'the madness of the gods' because of its effects, very similar to the effects of inebriation and drugs."

References

Women mystery writers
Spanish women novelists
1958 births
Living people
George Mason University alumni
University of Navarra alumni
People from Pamplona
Spanish emigrants to the United States
20th-century Spanish novelists
Spanish romantic fiction writers
American women journalists
Women romantic fiction writers
20th-century American women writers
20th-century American non-fiction writers
20th-century Spanish women
21st-century American women